Leemhuis is a surname. Notable people with the surname include:

Jaap Leemhuis (born 1941), Dutch field hockey player
Joan Leemhuis-Stout (born 1946), Dutch politician
Niels Leemhuis (born 1997), Dutch footballer

Dutch-language surnames